Igor Sijsling was the defending champion, but lost in the first round to Kevin Krawietz.
Rajeev Ram won the title, defeating Karol Beck 6–4, 6–2 in the final.

Seeds

Draw

Finals

Top half

Bottom half

References
 Main Draw
 Qualifying Draw

2011 ATP Challenger Tour
2011 Singles